Reinhold D. Lochmann (born May 26, 1944) is an American former professional basketball player from Wichita, Kansas.

A 6'6" forward from the University of Kansas, Lochmann played three seasons (1967–1970) in the American Basketball Association as a member of the Dallas Chaparrals. He averaged 4.3 points per game in his career.

Notes

1944 births
Living people
American men's basketball players
Basketball players from Wichita, Kansas
Dallas Chaparrals players
Kansas Jayhawks men's basketball players
Parade High School All-Americans (boys' basketball)
Small forwards